Feira is a former civil parish in the municipality of Santa Maria da Feira, Portugal. In 2013, the parish merged into the new parish Santa Maria da Feira, Travanca, Sanfins e Espargo. Covering the historic city centre, it was the seat of the Santa Maria da Feira Municipality. It has a population of 11,040 inhabitants and a total area of 8.40 km2.  Its name of inhabitants are known as Feirense. Official city name: Santa Maria da Feira. The surrounding area is often known as Terras de Santa Maria.

The parish is the location of a medieval castle.  It is also famous for its local bread named fogaça and its local market.

Sights

Sights include the Convento do Espírito Santo (convent), the Igreja da Misericórdia (church; 18th century), and the Rua Direita (street; 18th and 19th centuries' architecture). Its greatest landmark is the castelo Santa Maria da Feira Castle, from the 11th century.

Sporting clubs 

Clube Desportivo Feirense
Sporting Clube de Santa Maria da Feira

References

External links 
:
Santa Maria Biweekly Journal
Santa Maria da Feira portal
Sporting Clube de Santa Maria da Feira

Former parishes of Santa Maria da Feira